The Cathedral of the Assumption is a Catholic cathedral located in Majuro, Republic of the Marshall Islands.  It is the seat of the Apostolic Prefecture of the Marshall Islands, which covers the entire country, as well as Wake Atoll (dependent on the United States). It is located in the city center.

The current apostolic prefect is Raymundo Sabio.

It was built in 1898, with the arrival of the missionaries of the Order of the Sacred Heart in Majuro Atoll. It is separated from the Diocese of the Carolines and Marshall Islands on April 23, 1993, under Pope John Paul II.

References

Assumption, Majuro
Roman Catholic churches in the Marshall Islands
Churches in the Marshall Islands
Majuro
Roman Catholic churches completed in 1898
19th-century Roman Catholic church buildings